The Jashar Pasha Mosque is a Mosque in Prishtina, Kosovo.
It was named after Mehmet Yasar.

See also
 Historical monuments in Pristina
 Religion in Pristina

References

Religious buildings and structures in Pristina